Trojans Hockey Club is a field hockey club that plays at Stoneham Lane in Southampton.

The club runs six men's, five women's and junior teams. The men's first XI play in the South Premier Division 2 (4th tier of English hockey)  and the women's first XI play in the England Hockey League Investec Conference West (2nd tier of English hockey).

Major national honours
Trojans hockey club has reached two major national finals during its history.
 1977-78 Men's National League Runner Up
 1994-95 Women's National Cup Runner-Up

Men's International players past and present

Ladies International players past and present

References

English field hockey clubs